Anđeo (English: Angel) is the fourth studio album by Marija Šerifović.

Track listing 
Šta da zaboravim
Istinu prećuti
Jedan vidi sve
Kada ljubiš anđela
Nisi tu
Ne ostavljaj traga
Kao da nisam živa
Party Tonight

External links
 Marija Šerifović official page (Serbian and English)
 On: www.discogs.com

2009 albums
Marija Šerifović albums